Nightingale College is a private for-profit college headquartered in Salt Lake City, Utah. The college offers four nursing programs, the Associate of Science in Nursing, the Bachelor of Science in Nursing, the Registered nurse-to-BSN Program, and the Master of Science in Nursing Education Program. As of 2021, the college has satellite locations in 12 states.

History
Nightingale College was formed in 2010 and was originally "training students while seeking accreditation." In April 2011 the college began offering the Associate of Science in Nursing (ADN) Program. By May 2020 Nightingale college had 18 locations across the United States. In the college's first ten years more than 1000 students graduated.

Accreditation 
Nightingale College has accreditation from both the Accrediting Bureau of Health Schools and the Commission on Collegiate Nursing Education.

References

External links
 Official website

Nursing schools in Utah
2010 establishments in Utah
Educational institutions established in 2010
Private universities and colleges in Utah
For-profit schools in the United States